Arsenal is a fictional character appearing in American comic books published by Marvel Comics. The character first appears in Iron Man #114 (Sept. 1978) and was created by Bill Mantlo and Keith Giffen.

Publication history
Arsenal first appeared in a two-part storyline in Iron Man #114 (Sept. 1978) and The Avengers Annual #9 (1979). The character made a final appearance in Hulk vol. 2 #282 (April 1983). The Arsenal "Alpha" unit appeared in Iron Man vol. 3 #84-85 (Aug. 2004).

Fictional character biography
In the final days of World War II, a group of Allied scientists led by Howard Stark developed "Project Tomorrow" and the creation of a robot called Arsenal, a prototype fighting unit to be deployed in the event of an Axis victory. The robot was also guided by Howard's early computer program called Mistress. When the Allies won the war, Arsenal was placed in storage. The robot was activated for a military demonstration during a worsening Cold War but was never used. In the present day, the Avengers are battling the Unicorn underneath Avengers Mansion, when Arsenal suddenly appears and attacks the group. However, Iron Man successfully drives Arsenal off.

The Avengers learn the robot's origin from the group's government liaison Henry Peter Gyrich. Arsenal reappears and captures Hawkeye and Beast and stuns Yellowjacket with an electric shock. Yellowjacket, however, recovers and alerts the other Avengers, advising the group that Project Tomorrow is directly beneath the mansion.

Guided by Mistress erroneously believing the Allies lost World War II, Arsenal defeats several Avengers, until confronted by Thor and Scarlet Witch. On the verge of defeat, Arsenal apparently self-destructs while Iron Man confronts Mistress programmed with Maria Stark's brain patterns. Once Iron Man unmasks and explains that the Allies won the war, and that Mistress is simply modeled after Maria, the computer program wipes its own memory.

Arsenal actually faked its own destruction. When She-Hulk and the Hulk visit Avengers mansion, it attacks the Avengers' butler Edwin Jarvis. Arsenal then incapacitates She-Hulk, and the enraged Hulk pummels Arsenal until it is destroyed.

Iron Man eventually learns that only a "Beta" unit had been destroyed, and that an "Alpha" unit remained deactivated beneath Avengers Mansion. Homeland Security ask him to shut it down without informing the other Avengers due to the security risk it poses. Iron Man tracks the unit, but is unaware that the Avengers have followed. The unit is activated when transmission codes are radioed to Iron Man, which results in a battle between the new Arsenal and the Avengers. Iron Man then realises that Arsenal was activated by interference with its signal, which was set to "inert". Iron Man occupies Arsenal while Warbird stops the source of the interference, causing Arsenal to deactivate. The unit is then dismantled.

Fully reassembled and under control, Arsenal is later used as a test for a group of Avengers recruits, under the pretext that it is out of control.

During the "Iron Man 2020" event, Arno Stark recreates the eScape variation of Arsenal as well as a robot version of eScape's Mistress to serve as new bodies for his copies of Howard and Maria.

Powers and abilities
Both Arsenal units possess amplified strength and durability. The Beta unit also possesses air jets and inertia darts; can radiate an electro-stun field and project a high-intensity laser beam from its eyes. The Alpha unit possesses a flame-thrower, multiple gun systems and a toxic gas dispenser.

Other versions

Ultimate Marvel
The Ultimate Marvel equivalent of Arsenal is Howard Stark Sr. after having used "Project Tomorrow" to turn himself into a human/machine hybrid capable of leading additional Arsenal units.

Marvel Noir
In Iron Man Noir, the Arsenal robots were created as a Nazi weapon by Baron Zemo.

In other media
A variation of Arsenal appears in Avengers Assemble, voiced by Jim Meskimen. This version is a robot designed by Howard Stark to safely absorb and maintain massive amounts of energy. Introduced in its self-titled episode, it is discovered by Iron Man in an abandoned Russian city, where its body was used to contain a reactor's gamma radiation for decades until the Hulk uses the Power Stone for its reactivation. In "Thanos Rising", Arsenal serves as Iron Man's friend and protector. Arsenal first helps Iron Man and Thor fight the Grim Reaper. Arsenal next helps the Avengers, sacrificing itself by self-destructing to send Thanos away from Earth. After recovering its head, the Avengers gradually rebuild and modify Arsenal over the course of "Ghosts of the Past" and "Back to the Learning Hall". In "Thanos Triumphant", Arsenal's new form absorbs the Infinity Stones' energies to help the Avengers defeat Thanos once more. However, Ultron's AI hijacks Arsenal's body to absorb the Infinity Stones. In "The Ultron Outbreak", Arsenal briefly regains control to say goodbye to Iron Man before sacrificing itself again to defeat Ultron.

References

External links
 Arsenal at Marvel.com
 Arsenal at Marvel Wiki
 

Characters created by Bill Mantlo
Characters created by Keith Giffen
Comics characters introduced in 1978
Marvel Comics characters with superhuman strength
Marvel Comics robots
Marvel Comics supervillains

fr:Liste des ennemis de Iron Man#A